"Never Never" is the lead single from American nu metal band Korn's eleventh studio album, The Paradigm Shift. The band's first single with cofounding guitarist Brian "Head" Welch since 2004, it became their first number one on the Mainstream Rock Songs chart.

Background and composition

"It's a relationship song," said Jonathan Davis. "You go through that shit and you get hurt so bad. Then you think, 'It's not worth it anymore. I'm not going to fucking love again.' You experience so many pressures to be a good dad, a good husband, a good lover, or whatever. Being in a relationship is a lot of work."

Release

Released to alternative, active rock and heritage rock radio on August 12, 2013, the single was made available for purchase through Amazon MP3 on August 20, 2013.

"We just got our first No.1 single," marvelled Jonathan Davis. "It's amazing that, after twenty years, we're still putting out shit that people like."

Music video

An official lyric video was uploaded to YouTube on August 13, 2013, and the band filmed a music video with director Giovanni Bucci. The latter premiered on September 6, 2013.

Formats and track listings

Charts

With the song entering the Alternative Songs chart, Korn have 21 appearances on the chart, making them the artist with the most appearances on that chart without hitting number one.

Weekly charts

Year-end charts

Appearances in media
"Never Never" was used as WWE's official 2013 TLC (Tables Ladders Chairs) pay-per-view theme song.

References

Korn songs
2013 singles
2013 songs
Songs written by Reginald Arvizu
Songs written by Jonathan Davis
Songs written by James Shaffer
Songs written by Brian Welch